Shelton Smith (born  December 4, 1942) is the current editor of The Sword of the Lord, a Christian fundamentalist publisher, based in Murfreesboro, Tennessee. He is involved with the Independent Baptist movement.

History
Shelton Smith was a long time Pastor, his longest tenure being at Church of the Open Door/Carroll Christian Schools in Westminster, Maryland, from 1979 to 1995.  He received his Doctor of Ministry, Practical Theology from Luther Rice Seminary in 1976, and his Doctor of Theology from Midwestern Baptist College & Seminary in 2003.

With the passing of Curtis Hutson, Smith became the editor of The Sword of the Lord in April 1995. Smith has continued to lead The Sword with its association with the Independent Baptist movement.  Smith continues editing The Sword as well as preaching in churches around America.

Books
Autobiography Of Ambition—Sword of the Lord Pub
Battle Over Baptism, The—Sword of the Lord Pub
Behold the Lamb—Sword of the Lord Pub
"Do It Aagain, Lord!"—Sword of the Lord Pub
Is Everybody Going to Heaven?—Sword of the Lord Pub
Islam: A Raging Storm—Sword of the Lord Pub
Jesus Paid It All—Sword of the Lord Pub
Scriptural Fellowship—Sword of the Lord Pub
That's My Crowd!—Sword of the Lord Pub
The Book We Call the Bible—Sword of the Lord Pub

External links
 The Sword of the Lord
 Official Short Biography of Shelton Smith
 Sermons by Shelton Smith

1942 births
Living people
Baptist ministers from the United States
Place of birth missing (living people)
Christian fundamentalists
Evangelists
People from Westminster, Maryland
Christian critics of Islam
American critics of Islam
Baptists from Maryland